The FIVB Volleyball Women's World Championship is the process that a national women's volleyball team goes through to qualify for the FIVB Volleyball Women's World Championship finals.

Qualifying tournaments are held within the five FIVB continental zones (Africa, Asia and Oceania, North and Central America and Caribbean, South America, Europe), and are organized by their respective confederations. For each tournament, FIVB decides beforehand the number of places in the finals allocated to each of the continental zones, based on the numbers or relative strength of the confederations' teams.

The most recent qualification process was the 2022 FIVB Volleyball Women's World Championship qualification which commenced in 2018 and finished in 2021.

History

Summary

Graphical
Gray=Africa
Gold=Asia
Blue=Europe
Red=North America
Green=South America

Participation
These are the number of teams that participated in all levels of qualification in the last world championship:

Key to map

Current format

Summary

Africa
First round: The bottom ranked tean of Africa were divided into seven groups of seven zonal association, later six groups of six zonal association. The group winners and runners-up advanced to the second round of FIVB World Championship qualification and CAVB Championship.
Second round (CAVB Championship): A total of 13 teams (hosts, teams ranked 1–2 of Africa, nine first round winners and two wildcard teams), later 9 teams were divided into two groups. The top two teams of each group advanced to the play-offs. The winners of play-offs will qualified for the FIVB World Championship.

Asia and Oceania
First round: The bottom ranked teams of Asia were divided into three groups of three zonal association. The group winners advanced to the second round of FIVB World Championship qualification.
Second round: A total of 10 teams (teams ranked 1–7 and three first round winners) were divided into two groups of five teams. The top two teams of each group qualified for the FIVB World Championship.

Europe
First round: The 8 bottom ranked teams of Asia were divided into two groups of small association. The group winners advanced to the second round of FIVB World Championship qualification. The first round will also act as the European Championship Small Countries Division qualification round.
Second round: A total of 36 teams (teams ranked 1–34 and two first round winners) were divided into six groups of six teams. The winner team of each group qualified for the FIVB World Championship, whereas the runners-up in each pool will qualify for the third round.
Third round: A total of 6 teams (runners-up of second round winners) played in round robin format. The top two teams qualified for the FIVB World Championship.

North America
First round: The bottom ranked teams of North America were divided into three (CAZOVA), two (ECVA), a (AFECAVOL) group(s) of three zonal association. The best two teams of each group advanced to the second round of FIVB World Championship qualification.
Second round (CAZOVA Championship and ECVA Championship): A total of 10 (CAZOVA), 6 (ECVA) teams (the best two teams in first round) were divided into two groups of 5 (CAZOVA), 3 (ECVA) teams. The winners teams of two tournaments qualified for the 2018 FIVB World Championship.
Third round (NORCECA Continental Championship):

South America
First round (CSV Championship): A total of 6 teams played in round robin format. The winners will qualified for the FIVB World Championship.
Second round: A total of 4 teams played in round robin format. The winners will qualified for the FIVB World Championship.

First appearance in qualification (1986-2022)
Note: Only teams that played at least one match are considered for the purposes of first appearance. Teams that withdrew prior to the qualification, or that qualified to the World Cup by walkover due to other teams' withdrawals, are not considered.

Notes

See also
 National team appearances in the FIVB Volleyball Women's World Championship

References